The Johann Strauss Orchestra is a pops orchestra founded in the Netherlands by André Rieu in 1987. The orchestra is well known for performing classical works with a distinctly unorthodox frivolity, joking with the audience and performing all sorts of antics.

Performances and recordings

Rieu and his orchestra have performed throughout Europe, in North America, Japan, and Australia. Winning a number of awards, including two World Music Awards, their recordings have gone gold and platinum in many countries, including eight-time platinum in the Netherlands.

At Rieu's studios in Maastricht, the orchestra has recorded a wide range of classical, popular and folk music, and music from cinema and musical theatre. His lively orchestral presentations, in tandem with effective marketing, have attracted worldwide audiences to this subgenre of classical music.

Some of the orchestra's performances have been broadcast in the United Kingdom on Sky Arts and the United States on the PBS television network such as the 2003 airing of Andre Rieu Live in Dublin, filmed in Dublin, Ireland, and 2003's André Rieu Live in Tuscany filmed in the Piazza Della Repubblica in the village of Cortona in Tuscany.

History 
Gemma Serpenti and the Dutch violinist and conductor, André Rieu founded the Maastricht Salon Orchestra (MSO) in 1978. In the beginning, André Rieu performed small classical crossover concerts with the MSO. The group has served as the vehicle for Rieu's increasingly ambitious ideas since its founding. In 1987 André renamed the MSO as the Johann Strauss Orchestra to emphasise waltz music. On the occasion of Rieu's first concert with the orchestra, on January 1, 1988, there were 12 musicians.

At the time the orchestra first toured Europe, there emerged a renewed interest in waltz music. The revival began in the Netherlands and was ignited by their recording of the Second Waltz from Shostakovich's Suite for Variety Orchestra. As a result, Rieu became known as the modern "Waltz King," a title originally bestowed upon Johann Strauss II.

The orchestra has performed regularly with guest musicians and singers such as Carla Maffioletti, Mirusia Louwerse, Carmen Monarcha and the Platin Tenors.

Members
By 2008, the orchestra had expanded to 43 members, and in the 2010s the group variously included anywhere from 80 to 150 members, depending on venue and occasion. The most senior member of the orchestra is Jean Sassen, who has been a member since 1987.

References

External links
 André Rieu (official website)
 André Rieu fansite
 André Rieu fansite (mainly movies)
 André Rieu fansite
 
 André Rieu TV full concert movies
 André Rieu TV on facebook

Dutch orchestras
1987 establishments in the Netherlands
Musical groups established in 1987
Musical groups from Limburg (Netherlands)
South Limburg (Netherlands)
Culture in Maastricht
Strauss family
Pops orchestras